The Best Years is a Canadian drama television series about a group of college students at Charles University, a fictional Ivy League school in Boston, Massachusetts. It stars Charity Shea as Samantha Best, an orphan who lived in the foster care system for ten years before receiving a scholarship to Charles. The show was created by Aaron Martin and produced by Wendy Grean.

The first season aired on Global in Canada and on Noggin's teen block, The N, in the United States. The second season was shown in the United States on The N and in Canada on E!, CanWest's secondary network.

Plot
The show revolves around Samantha Best (Charity Shea). She receives a scholarship to attend Charles University, a fictional Ivy League college in Boston, Massachusetts, after bouncing between foster homes for ten years.

The first season included episodes about sensitive topics like cocaine addiction, inappropriate teacher-student relationships, and suicide. The second and final season picked up eight months after season one with several characters absent and replaced with new characters and focused romantic entanglements.

Cast and characters

Main
 Charity Shea as Samantha Best
 Randal Edwards as Noah Jensen
 Jennifer Miller as Kathryn Klarner
 Brandon Jay McLaren as Devon Sylver (season 1)
 Athena Karkanis as Dawn Vargaz (season 1)
 Niall Matter as Trent Hamilton (season 1)
 Tommy Lioutas as Rich Powell (season 2)
 Michael Xavier as Delman (season 2)
 Nadiya Chettiar as Poppi Bansal (season 2)
 Mishael Morgan as Robyn Crawford (season 2)

Recurring
 Sherry Miller as Dorothy O'Sullivan
 Lauren Collins as Alicia O'Sullivan (season 2; guest season 1)
 Ashley Newbrough as Sloane McCarthy (season 1)
 Ashley Diana Morris as Shannon Biel (season 1)
 Alan Van Sprang as Lee Campbell (season 1)
 Evan Buliung as Professor Warren

Episodes

Season 1 (2007)
The first season of The Best Years was first shown in Canada on Global from May 22 to August 14, 2007. In the United States, it aired on The N from June 29 to September 21, 2007, at 8:30 to 9:30 pm EST on Friday nights.

Season 2 (2009)

Production notes
The show's theme song is titled "Infinite Possibility" and was written and performed by Mark Wiebe, also known as Markattack or Sinewave. Outdoor scenes from the show were filmed on the campus of the University of Guelph in Guelph, Ontario, as well as the University of Toronto, and interior scenes of the campus were re-created at the Toronto Film Studios.

Home release
Entertainment One has released the entire series on DVD in Region 1.

Ratings
According to Mediaweek, ratings the show debuted with 323,250 total viewers on Friday, June 29 at 8:30 p.m. ET, which more than doubled the time period average.

References

External links

 
 
 

2000s Canadian drama television series
2000s college television series
2007 Canadian television series debuts
2009 Canadian television series endings
Canadian television soap operas
English-language television shows
Global Television Network original programming
The N original programming
Serial drama television series
Television series by Entertainment One
Television shows filmed in Toronto
Television shows set in Boston